Kenneth Gilbert Adjei is a Ghanaian politician who served as a Deputy Minister of Defence from 2015 to 2017 during the John Mahama Administration. He is a member of the National Democratic Congress. A graduate of the University of Ghana Business School, he is also a marketing executive who previously served as a member of the Board of the National Lottery Authority and currently serves as a board executive of the Lordina foundation.

Early life and education 
Adjei is a native of Trede, in the Ashanti Region of Ghana. He attended Opoku Ware School for his secondary school education. He served as the Dining Hall prefect whilst at Opoku Ware School. He proceeded to the Ghana Institute of Management and Public Administration (GIMPA) where he completed with a Bachelor of Science degree in marketing. He also holds a Mater of Business Administration (MBA) from the University of Ghana Business School.

Career 
Adjei was the Program Director of the Lordina Foundation, a foundation founded by Lordina Mahama, former first Lady of Ghana. He is a marketing executive who previously served as a member of the Board of the National Lottery Authority and currently serves as a board executive of the Lordina foundation.

Politics 
Adjei is a member of the National Democratic Congress and was a member of Tertiary Education Institution Network (TEIN) of the NDC during his time at GIMPA. In March 2015, he was appointed by President John Dramani Mahama to serve as the deputy Minister of Defence. He was vetted on 15 April 2015, approved on 14 May and sworn in on 18 May 2015. He served in that role until 7 January 2017 when his government handed over to the Nana Akufo Addo government.

Personal life 
Adjei is married with three children. He enjoys listening to music and playing golf during his leisure hours.

References 

Living people
National Democratic Congress (Ghana) politicians
People from Ashanti Region
Akan people
Alumni of Opoku Ware School
Year of birth missing (living people)
Ghana Institute of Management and Public Administration alumni
University of Ghana alumni